Uptown 3000 was a Korean American hip hop duo on the record label The Machine Group CEO Alvin & Calvin Waters which consisted of Carlos Galvan aka "Cali-Mexci" and Steve Kim aka "Kwon".  The duo was a spinoff of Uptown, a Korean hip hop group which was active in the late 1990s whose sales reached 6 million. The duo is considered defunct as the original Uptown made its comeback in Korea in 2006, which Kim and Galvan were a part of. The group has been credited with being the first Korean hip hop group to closely resemble anything similar to American style hip hop.

Return to Korea
In 2006, Kim and Galvan returned to Korea to re-form Uptown with Chris Jung. They released a new album, Testimony.

Appearances
 The duo was featured in the PBS documentary film Los Angeles Now.

Discography
 Same Book, Different Chapter (2003) (The Machine Group CEO Alvin & Calvin Waters)

References

South Korean hip hop groups